Utricularia arenaria is a small annual carnivorous plant that belongs to the genus Utricularia. It is native to tropical and southern Africa, where it can be found in Angola, Burundi, Cameroon, Côte d'Ivoire, the Democratic Republic of the Congo, Ethiopia, Gabon, Ghana, Kenya, Madagascar, Malawi, Mali, Mozambique, Nigeria, Senegal, Sierra Leone, South Africa, Sudan, Tanzania, Togo, Uganda, Zambia, and Zimbabwe. There has also been a single collection from central India in Madhya Pradesh. It was originally described and published by Alphonse Pyrame de Candolle in 1844.

Synonyms 
U. arenaria covers a vast native range and is a variable species, which accounts for the moderate amount of synonymy.
[U. ecklonii H.Perrier]
U. exilis Oliv.
U. exilis var. arenaria (A.DC.) Kamieński
U. exilis var. bryoides Welw. ex Hiern
U. exilis var. ecklonii (Spreng.) Kamieński
U. exilis var. hirsuta Kamieński
U. exilis var. nematoscapa Welw. ex Hiern
U. kirkii Stapf
U. monophylla Dinter
[U. parkeri H.Perrier]
Utricularia sp. prob. U. exilis Oliv. & sp. aff. U. exilis Suess. & Merxm.
U. tribracteata Hochst. ex A.Rich.

See also 
 List of Utricularia species

References

External links 

arenaria
Carnivorous plants of Africa
Carnivorous plants of Asia
Flora of East Tropical Africa
Flora of Ethiopia
Flora of India (region)
Flora of Madagascar
Flora of South Tropical Africa
Flora of Southern Africa
Flora of Sudan
Flora of West Tropical Africa
Flora of West-Central Tropical Africa